Ricardo José Moutinho Chéu (born 14 May 1981) is a Portuguese football manager, currently in charge of Doxa Katokopias FC.

Managerial career
After leading Académico de Viseu to a mid-table finish in the 2013–14 season, Chéu was appointed in May 2014 as the new coach of Penafiel. Following three defeats in the first four games of the 2014–15 season, Chéu reached a mutual agreement to leave Penafiel.

In November 2014, two months after departing from Penafiel, Chéu returned to management by returning to former side Académico de Viseu. In his second stint with the Viriatos, Chéu led the Viseu to a twelfth-place finish. The following season, the 2015–16 season, saw Chéu depart during the halfway stage of the season after a string of poor results. He then worked for Freamunde.

In July 2018 he moved to Italy, accepting the role of head coach of newly promoted Serie C club Rieti. He resigned on 30 December following a club's change of ownership.

On 9 January 2019 Chéu was named new head coach of Slovak Super Liga club Senica on an 18-month deal, with the club second from bottom. Having avoided relegation, he moved in June to Spartak Trnava in the same league. He was replaced a year later, after coming fifth.

Chéu returned to his country's second tier on 11 September 2021, succeeding Rui Santos at 13th-placed Estrela da Amadora. He left by mutual consent at the end of the season on 1 June, having fallen one place in the table over his spell.

Managerial statistics

References

External links

1983 births
Living people
Portuguese football managers
Portuguese expatriate football managers
Académico de Viseu F.C. managers
Primeira Liga managers
Liga Portugal 2 managers
F.C. Penafiel managers
F.C. Rieti managers
Serie C managers
FK Senica managers
FC Spartak Trnava managers
Slovak Super Liga managers
Expatriate football managers in Italy
Expatriate football managers in Slovakia
Portuguese expatriate sportspeople in Italy
Portuguese expatriate sportspeople in Slovakia
Sportspeople from Guarda District